Tetyana Viktorivna Lazareva (born 4 July 1981) is a Ukrainian female wrestler. She represented Ukraine at the 2012 Summer Olympics in women's freestyle 55 kg. She finished 5th after losing to Tonya Verbeek in the quarter-finals and to Jackeline Renteria in the repechage. She competed in the same weight category at the 2004 Summer Olympics.

Lazareva was coached by her husband, Grigori Shepelyev, with whom she has two sons – Aleksandr and Alexei.

References

External links
 bio on fila-wrestling.com
 sports-reference.com

Living people
People from Türkmenabat
1981 births
Ukrainian female sport wrestlers
Olympic wrestlers of Ukraine
Wrestlers at the 2004 Summer Olympics
Wrestlers at the 2012 Summer Olympics
World Wrestling Championships medalists
20th-century Ukrainian women
21st-century Ukrainian women